Steve Helminiak is an American football coach.  He is the head football coach at Loras College located in Dubuque, Iowa, a position he has held since midway through the 2013 season.  Helminiak served as the head football coach at Southern Oregon University from 2006 to 2010.  His coaching record at Southern Oregon was 16–31.

Head coaching record

Notes

References

External links
 Loras profile

Year of birth missing (living people)
Living people
Loras Duhawks football coaches
Loras Duhawks football players
Rockford Regents football coaches
Southern Oregon Raiders football coaches